Ḫulbazizi, inscribed in cuneiform phonetically Ḫul.ba.zi.zi, “the Evil is Eradicated” or more literally "Evil (be) gone", is an ancient Mesopotamian exorcistic incantation series extant in earlier Sumerian and later Akkadian forms, the language switch taking place in the late Bronze Age, directed at every sort of evil (mimma lemnu), including a spell (ša malṭi eršiya, see below) against everything scary that hides below one's bed at night, depicted on an amulet with the terrified subject seated upright on his bed while a small dragon emerges from beneath to be confronted by a third figure.

The text

The title by which the series is now known comes from the rubric on the last line, which may only actually refer to a couple of the preceding incantations rather than the composition as a whole. The final incantation in the collection entreats the planet Jupiter, the Pleiades and the deity Irragal (another name for Nergal) to deflect evil from the subject. The title appears on line seven of one of the manuscripts of the Exorcists Manual, the only one legible at this point. The opening incipit of the series begins Sil7-lá lúérim-ma.

Two Ḫulbazizi incantations appear on Kassite seals depicting the fish-sage apkallu and its incantations were frequently invoked on amulets and charms, decorated with suitable apotropaic illustrations such as that of Ugallu, the lion-headed demon, during the Neo-Assyrian period:

Some of its incantations were later to be sampled in the Muššu'u, "rubbing", compendium.

Primary publication

See also
Ancient Mesopotamian religion
Asag/Asakku
Gallu
Utukku

References

Akkadian literature